Playing dead may refer to:

Playing dead, a variation of Planking (fad)
Playing dead, or apparent death, an animal behaviour
"Playing Dead", a track on the 2015 album Every Open Eye by Chvrches
"Playing Dead", an episode of TV series Law & Order: Criminal Intent (season 8)
"Playing Dead", a story in the book Just Tricking! by Andy Griffiths
Playing Dead (film), a 2013 French comedy film
 Playing Dead: A Contemplation Concerning the Arctic, a book by Rudy Wiebe

See also
Play Dead (disambiguation)